The 1975 Maryland Terrapins football team represented University of Maryland in the 1975 NCAA Division I football season. The Terrapins offense scored 312 points while the defense allowed 150 points. Led by head coach Jerry Claiborne, the Terrapins appeared in the Gator Bowl, where they defeated Florida.

Schedule

Roster

1976 NFL Draft
The following players were selected in the 1976 NFL Draft.

References

Maryland
Maryland Terrapins football seasons
Atlantic Coast Conference football champion seasons
Gator Bowl champion seasons
Maryland Terrapins football